Deptford Bridge may refer to:
Deptford Bridge, an area of Deptford, London
Deptford Bridge DLR station
Cornish Rebellion of 1497 which included the Battle of Deptford Bridge